Uaica is a hunter in the story "The Sleep Tree" of the Karajá and Apinaye people of the rain forests in the central and northern Amazonian plateau.

External links
The Story of Uaica
"The Dreaming Tree"

Indigenous culture of Eastern Brazil
Amazon mythology
Brazilian mythology
Heroes in mythology and legend